The Ponzán group was an organization of guides and couriers, made up mainly of Spanish anarchists, which operated in Southern France and in Spain during World War II. It took its name from Francisco Ponzán Vidal, who was mainly responsible for the group. Its center of operations was located in Toulouse. For a source of income, the Ponzán Group worked for the Pat O'Leary escape network guiding Allied
airmen who had been shot down over German-occupied Europe to Spain and safety from capture.

History
In the words of Albert Guérisse, head of the English Pat O'Leary Line. 

Robert Terres, a French agent, referred to the members of the Ponzán Group as: 

Agustín Remiro, arrested and sentenced to death after a Ponzán Group mission in Spain and Portugal, wrote in a letter addressed to López (probably Eusebio López Laguarta) from the Madrid prison:

See also 
Spanish Democratic Alliance
Spanish Revolution of 1936
Francisco Ponzán
Pat O'Leary Line

References

Bibliography
 
 
 
 
 
 

1940s establishments in Spain
1940s disestablishments in Spain
Defunct anarchist militant groups
Defunct organisations based in Spain
Spain in World War II
France in World War II
World War II resistance movements
French Resistance
Anti-Francoism
Spanish Anti-Francoists